The State Register of Heritage Places is maintained by the Heritage Council of Western Australia. , 97 places are heritage-listed in the Shire of East Pilbara, of which seven are on the State Register of Heritage Places.

List
The Western Australian State Register of Heritage Places, lists the following seven state registered places within the Shire of East Pilbara:

References

East
 
East